Larry Evans may refer to:

 Larry Evans (American football) (born 1953), American football linebacker
 Larry Evans (author) (died 1925), American writer
 Larry Evans (chess player) (1932–2010), American chess grandmaster